The Princess Sweet Shop is a historic building located in Iowa Falls, Iowa, United States.  It is noted as "an outstanding example of Art Deco design from 1935. The Carrara Glass façade, and streamlined woodwork are typical of Art Deco design of the 1920s and 1930s, but a rarity in a small town in Iowa."  E.J. Karrys opened the Princess in 1915, and the Sweet Shop opened by H.K. Pergakis two years later.  Both Karrys and Pergakis were Greek immigrants, a group who were known to establish candy shop around the U.S.  They combined their operations at the Princess location in 1928.  The building was destroyed in a fire on December 25, 1934.  Local architect L.L. Klippel  designed the new building, which was completed in 1935.  It was the first building in Iowa Falls that was air conditioned.  Members of the Perkagis maintained ownership until 1987.  The business is still in operation as a soda fountain under different ownership.

The building was individually listed on the National Register of Historic Places in 1993.   It was included as a contributing property in the Washington Avenue Commercial Historic District in 2012.

References

Commercial buildings completed in 1935
Art Deco architecture in Iowa
Commercial buildings on the National Register of Historic Places in Iowa
Buildings and structures in Hardin County, Iowa
National Register of Historic Places in Hardin County, Iowa
Individually listed contributing properties to historic districts on the National Register in Iowa
Iowa Falls, Iowa